The Oswego Canal is a canal in the New York State Canal System located in New York, United States.

The modern canal essentially follows the route of the Oswego River, canalized with locks & dams. Three locks, with a total lift of  take boats over what had been a steep set of rapids at the city of Oswego. This is the only route from the Atlantic/Hudson River system to Lake Ontario fully within the United States.

Volume of shipping 

In 2013 National Public Radio station WRVO reported that the volume of shipping had been increasing, for several years, averaging about 80-120 vessels, per year.  It attributed the increase to change in neighboring Canada's protection for shipping grain grown in Canada.

Locks 
The following list of locks is provided for the current canal, from south to north. There are a total of 7 locks on the Oswego Canal.

Overall sidewall height will vary by lock, ranging between  depending on the lift and navigable stages.

Note: There is no Lock O4 on the Oswego Canal. The Oswego Canal officially begins at the "Three Rivers" confluence of the Oneida, Seneca and Oswego rivers near Phoenix, New York. Lock O8 in Oswego was originally installed as a "siphon lock", which required air valves to push water in and out of the lock. It initially had issues holding a vacuum in the tank until a pump was added in 1943. The lock was converted to electrical culvert valves consistent with others on the New York State Canal System in 1968.

Distance is based on position markers from an interactive canal map provided online by the New York State Canal Corporation and may not exactly match specifications on signs posted along the canal. Mean surface elevations are comprised from a combination of older canal profiles and history books as well as specifications on signs posted along the canal. The margin of error should normally be within .

All surface elevations are approximate.

References 

Recreational Chart 14786 New York State Barge Canal System, 12th Edition, Washington, D.C., U.S. Department of Commerce, May 23, 1998.
 Janet Larkin, "The Oswego Canal : A Connecting Link Between the United States and Canada, 1819-1837," Ontario History, CIII (Spring 2011), 23–41.

External links 
 Information and Boater's Guide to the Oswego Canal
 New York State Oswego Canal
 Photos of one of the locks in the canal system
 

Canals in New York (state)
Transportation in Onondaga County, New York
Transportation buildings and structures in Oswego County, New York
Tourist attractions in Onondaga County, New York
Tourist attractions in Oswego County, New York
Oswego, New York
Canals opened in 1828
1828 establishments in New York (state)